Direct Relief (formerly known as Direct Relief International) is a nonprofit humanitarian organization whose mission is to improve the lives of people in poverty or emergency situations by providing the appropriate medical resources. The charity provides emergency medical assistance and disaster relief in the United States and internationally. The organization is headed by an independent board of directors and its president and CEO, Thomas Tighe.

History
In 1945, William Zimdin, an Estonian immigrant to the United States and businessman, began sending thousands of relief parcels to relatives, friends, and former employees in Europe to help with the aftermath of World War II. In 1948, Zimdin formalized his efforts with the establishment of the William Zimdin Foundation. Dezso Karczag, a Hungarian Jewish immigrant, assumed management of the foundation following Zimdin's death in 1951. Karczag changed the organization's name to Direct Relief Foundation in 1957.

In the early 1960s, the foundation refined its mission to serve disadvantaged populations in medically underserved communities around the world. To assist with this effort, Direct Relief became licensed as a wholesale pharmacy in 1962 to be able to provide prescription medicines. During this time, the organization also supported victims of natural disasters in the US and homeless populations in Santa Barbara, California. The foundation assumed the name Direct Relief International in 1982.

In 2004, the Direct Relief provided almost $122 million in medical aid to 54 countries. The same year, the organizationa assisted Sri Ramakrishna Math and GlaxoSmithKline with designing and implementing a one-year nurse assistant training program in India. The program was launched to empower young women in districts affected by the Indian Ocean tsunami. By 2019, over 1,200 nurses had graduated.

In 2011, Direct Relief Women held its first fundraiser for Direct Relief International. All money raised went toward providing safe births around the world. In 2013, Direct Relief International assumed the name Direct Relief.

After raising $3,300 for the American Cancer Society through a partnership with Direct Relief in 2016, Matthew Moffit and Direct Relief produced Zeldathon (playing Legend of Zelda for 36 hours straight) and formed Direct Relief Gaming, which has raised $14.1M since its inception and partnered with organizations such as Humble Bundle and Bungie.

In 2018, Direct Relief provided about $1.2 billion worth of wholesale materials to health centers in over 100 countries.

Operations
Between 2000 and 2014, the Direct Relief's operating budget averaged roughly $11 million per year. Over the same period, it reported delivering more than $1.6 billion in medical resources and supplies worldwide. Medical supplies come largely through in-kind donations by hundreds of pharmaceutical manufacturers.

The organization manages logistics and distribution through enterprise systems that include SAP, Esri, and in-kind transportation support from FedEx.

In 2019, Direct Relief opened a new Santa Barbara warehouse and distribution headquarters. The new building is 155,000-square-feet, earthquake-safe, and outfitted with state-of-the-art distribution technology for medical supplies. Direct Relief partnered with Tesla to create a microgrid power supply for the building. Solar panels are integrated with battery storage and generators to keep the headquarters running for up to six months in the face of a disaster and to store temperature-sensitive medications like insulin and vaccines.

Emergency preparedness and response

Relief efforts

Hurricanes

 Hurricane Katrina (2005): Direct Relief provided care to more than 37,170 evacuees and started their Hurricane Preparedness program after Hurricane Katrina occurred.
 Hurricane Ike (2008): Hurricane Ike displaced over 100,000 people in 2008. Direct Relief provided over $1.1 million in hurricane emergency aid as of September 20, 2008. The shipments contained medicines and hygienic supplies.
 Hurricane Gustav (2008): Direct Relief committed $250,000 in hurricane response funds to assist nonprofit clinics, community health centers, and alternate care sites, working with the National Association of Community Health Centers and State Primary Care Associations in the Gulf.
 Hurricane Irene (2011): Direct Relief worked closely with Merck to make tetanus vaccines available to clinics and community health centers affected by Hurricane Irene. The orgnization also collaborated with the National Association of Community Health Centers, the North Carolina Community Health Center Association, the Bi-State Primary Care Association, and the Vermont Coalition of Clinics for the Uninsured to offer assistance to people affected by Irene.
 Hurricane Sandy (2012): Direct Relief provided medical supplies to community clinics, nonprofit health centers, and other groups in areas affected by Hurricane Sandy, as well as mapping pharmacies, gas stations, and other facilities that remained in the New York City area despite power outages.
 Hurricane Matthew (2016): Direct Relief sent 16.7 tons of medicine and medical supplies via a donated FedEx plane to distribute in hospitals throughout the US.
 Hurricane Harvey (2017): Direct Relief provided funding and emergency supplies to Texas community health centers.
 Hurricane Irma (2017): Direct Relief coordinated with more than seventy healthcare partners in Florida and Puerto Rico, including the Florida Association of Community Health Centers and the Asociación de Salud Primaria de Puerto Rico, to support existing nonprofit community clinics and health centers.
 Hurricane Maria (2017): Between 2017 and 2018, Direct Relief provided $70.2M in medical aid for hurricane relief.
 Hurricane Florence (2018): Direct Relief committed an initial $200K in cash and made its medical inventory available for emergencies occurring on the US East Coast.
 Hurricane Dorian (2019): Direct Relief delivered medical aid and emergency supplies to affected areas in the Bahamas.

Earthquakes
 Pakistan earthquake (2005): Direct Relief provided over $14 million in assistance to local partners to help rebuild healthcare infrastructure.
 Peru earthquake (2007): Direct Relief worked with FedEx and donated 32 cartons of aid worth about $100K to earthquake victims in Peru.
 Haiti earthquake (2010): Direct Relief provided $57 million in emergency medical assistance.
 Nepal earthquake (2015): Direct Relief delivered over 6.2 million doses of daily medication to earthquake survivors.
 Mexico earthquake (2017): Following the 7.1 magnitude earthquake, Direct Relief provided emergency supplies to a trauma hospital in Mexico City.
 Indonesia earthquake (2019): Direct Relief made its inventory of $30 million in medicines and supplies readily available to earthquake survivors.
 Japan earthquake & tsunami (2011): The magnitude 9 Tōhoku earthquake led to over 16,000 deaths. After the disaster, Direct Relief and the Japanese American Citizens League established the Japan Relief and Recovery Fund.
 Turkey–Syria earthquake (2023): After a 7.8 magnitude earthquake, Direct relief donated $100,000 to SAMS and AKUT, Turkish search and rescue teams.

Volcanoes
 Guatemala – Volcán de Fuego (2018): Direct Relief coordinated with the Pan American Health Organization, local partners, and pharmaceutical companies to provide aid to those displaced and injured by the volcanic blasts. Medical staff had immediate access to medical inventory for emergency response.
 Hawaii – Kīlauea volcano (2018): Direct Relief aided in mitigation efforts by providing respirator masks to those affected by the eruption.

Disease outbreaks
In 2013, Direct Relief launched a program in partnership with Basic Health International to screen and treat women in Haiti for cervical cancer.
 H1N1 outbreak (2009): Direct Relief provided 478 clinics in 49 US states with H1N1 protective items to keep clinic workers healthy throughout flu season.
 Zika virus outbreak (2015): In 2016, Direct Relief established a Zika fund and helped fulfill requests for supplies in fourteen affected countries.
 DRC Ebola outbreak (2015): Since 2015, Direct Relief has provided $13.9 million in medical aid.
 Global COVID-19 pandemic (2019–2020): In January 2020, Direct Relief worked with FedEx Cares, the courier's global charitable platform, to fulfill an emergency order from medical staff in Wuhan's largest hospital, Wuhan Union Hospital.

Up to April 2020, the organization had distributed more than 145,000 pounds of medical aid in response to the COVID-19 pandemic. Direct Relief shipped supplies to hospitals and clinics in all 50 US states as well as institutions in 32 countries. The organization also started a new COVID-19 fund to provide community health centers financial support for healthcare workers. 3M donated $10 million to the fund. By June 2020, over 518 health centers had received funding through the COVID-19 fund.

In May 2020, Direct Relief announced that it was partnering with FedEx Cares to ship personal protective equipment to underserved communities around the US. The charity has sent over 350,000 surgical masks, 30,000 face masks, and 10,000 goggles to Mexico.

Wildfires
Direct Relief provides support to local and international wildfire incidents, including masks, vehicles, and funds to advance firefighter technology.
 Gap Fire (2008)
 Jesusita Fire (2009)
 Thomas Fire (2017)
 California wildfires (2018)
 Australia bushfires (2019–2020)

In July 2019, the organization released an analysis of which small towns in California could be the hardest hit by a fast-moving wildfire based on the numbers of low-income, immobile, aging, or disabled people in the community. Nine towns were given a "very high" social-vulnerability score.

Typhoons
 Typhoon Yutu (2018): The "super typhoon" hit the Northern Mariana Islands in October 2018. Direct Relief worked with Commonwealth Healthcare Corporation (the only hospital in the Northern Mariana Islands) and with other health facilities damaged by the storm to coordinate medical aid shipments. A shipment of 40,000 liters of drinking water along with other essential items was delivered in late October.

Maternal and child health
Direct Relief delivers medical aid to people in high-need areas worldwide by supporting partners that provide child and maternal health services through the full process of pregnancy. The organization provides midwives with the tools needed to provide delivery, antenatal, and postpartum care safely. In 2017, Direct Relief distributed 300 midwife kits to fourteen partners in seven countries in the Caribbean, Southeast Asia, and Sub-Saharan Africa, supporting 15,000 safe births.
 In July 2011, Direct Relief developed the Global Fistula Map in partnership with the United Nations Population Fund and the Fistula Foundation.
 In 2012, Direct Relief teamed up with Last Mile Health to launch a childhood pneumonia program in Liberia.
 Direct Relief provided midwife kits to hospitals and midwifery schools in Sierra Leone, Somaliland, and Nepal.
 Direct Relief increased support to Edna Adan University Hospital for the treatment and care of women with obstetric fistula. This included the construction and equipping of an operating theater and the development of a training curriculum for midwives and nurses.

Wars
 In March 2022, Direct Relief partnered with the Ukrainian Ministry of Health to provide medical aid, including emergency response packs intended for first responders, oxygen concentrators, and critical care medicines.

Charity reviews and awards
 2011 – Peter F. Drucker Award for Nonprofit Innovation
 2012 – Designated by the National Association of Boards of Pharmacy as a Verified-Accredited Wholesale Distributors licensed to distribute pharmaceutical medicines to all 50 US states and Washington, D.C.
 2013 – Esri President's Award for geographic information systems work to identify health condition patterns and medical needs
 2014 – Power of Partnership Award – National Association of Community Health Centers
 2014 – Charity Navigator ranked Direct Relief number one in its 2015 list, "10 of the Best Charities Everyone's Heard Of", and a "four-star" charity with a 99.94/100 charity score overall.
 2015 – Fast Company named the organization among "the World's Top 10 Most Innovative Companies of 2015 in Not-For-Profit".
 2015 – Forbes gave the organization a 100% fundraising efficiency rating.
 2019 – Ranked third by Fast Company in the World's Most Innovative: Not-for-Profit Sector.

References

External links

Charities based in California
Health charities in the United States
Emergency medicine organisations
Organizations established in 1948
Medical and health organizations based in California